Lieutenant General Bradley A. Heithold is a retired United States Air Force officer who served as Commander, Air Force Special Operations Command. He also was the Commander of the Air Force Intelligence, Surveillance and Reconnaissance Agency (AFISRA) until July 19, 2011 when he handed command to Major General Robert Otto. Heithold then became Vice Commander, United States Special Operations Command. As AFISRA Commander, Heithold's duties included providing multi-source ISR products, applications, capabilities and resources, as well as information operations forces and expertise.

Education
1981 Bachelor's degree in physics, University of Arkansas, AR 
1986 Squadron Officer School, Maxwell AFB, AL.
1991 Master of Public Administration degree, Troy State University, AL.
1995 Air Command and Staff College, Maxwell AFB, AL.
1998 National Defense Fellow, Florida International University, Miami, FL
1999 Armed Forces Staff College, Norfolk, Va.

Military career
Heithold entered the United States Air Force in 1974 and spent three years at Holloman AFB, New Mexico as an F-4D avionics technician. From there, he was commissioned in 1981 as a distinguished graduate of the ROTC program at the University of Arkansas. Heithold has commanded at the squadron, group and wing levels, including the 451st Air Expeditionary Group in Southwest Asia. Staff assignments include positions on the Air Staff and a unified command staff. He was at Air Force Special Operations Command Headquarters, Hurlburt Field, Florida, where he was Director of Plans, Programs, Requirements and Assessments. Heithold is a master navigator with more than 3,400 flight hours in the C-130, AC-130H, MC-130P and HC-130P.

Awards and decorations

Promotions
Second Lieutenant May 27, 1981 
First Lieutenant Aug. 5, 1983 
Captain Aug. 5, 1985 
Major May 1, 1993
Lieutenant Colonel Jan. 1, 1997
Colonel April 1, 2000
Brigadier General Sept. 2, 2006 
Major General Dec. 9, 2008
Lieutenant General Jul. 19, 2011
Source: Air Force biography

References

External links

  Air Force ISR Agency

1956 births
Living people
Recipients of the Air Force Distinguished Service Medal
Recipients of the Defense Distinguished Service Medal
Recipients of the Defense Superior Service Medal
Recipients of the Legion of Merit
United States Air Force generals
United States Air Force personnel of the War in Afghanistan (2001–2021)